Hazelton is an unincorporated community in Preston County, West Virginia, United States. Hazelton is located along Interstate 68, just east of Bruceton Mills.

The United States Penitentiary, Hazelton, a high-security federal prison, is located in northern Hazelton.

References

Unincorporated communities in Preston County, West Virginia
Unincorporated communities in West Virginia